Lars Gabriel Andersson (22 February 1868 – 13 February 1951) was a Swedish schoolteacher and herpetologist.

He studied at Uppsala University and earned his PhD in 1909. During his long career he taught classes at several schools in and near Stockholm. In 1894–95 and from 1897 to 1902 he worked as an assistant in the vertebrate department at the Naturhistoriska riksmuseet in Stockholm.

Taxa 
With zoologist Einar Lönnberg he described the following herpetological species:
 Aipysurus tenuis, 1913
 Atractaspis engdahli, 1913
 Eulamprus brachyosoma, 1915.
 Eulamprus tympanum, 1915
 Gastrotheca microdiscus, (Andersson in Lönnberg and Andersson, 1910).
 Glaphyromorphus mjobergi, 1915
 Strophurus taeniatus, 1913.

On his own, he described:
 Didynamipus sjostedti, 1903

Works by Andersson that have been published in English 
 "Catalogue of Linnean type-specimens of snakes in the Royal Museum in Stockholm", 1899.
 "Catalogue of Linnean type-specimens of Linnaeus's reptilia in the Royal Museum in Stockholm", 1900.
 "Some new species of snakes from Cameroon and South America, belonging to the collections of the Royal museum in Stockholm", 1901.
 "Reptiles, batrachians and fishes collected by the Swedish zoological expedition to British East Africa 1911", (with Einar Lönnberg), 1911.
 "Batrachians from Queensland", 1913.
 "Results of Dr. E. Mjöbergs Swedish Scientific Expeditions to Australia 1910–1913", part 4. Batrachians. (in reference to Swedish zoologist and ethnographer Eric Mjöberg).
 "Reptiles collected in Northern Queensland", 1915 (with Einar Lönnberg).
 "Notes on the reptiles and batrachians in the Zoological museum at Gothenburg, with an account of some new species", 1916.
 "A new salamander from Sakhalin", 1917.
 "Reptiles and batrachians from the Central Sahara", 1935.

References 

1868 births
1951 deaths
Swedish herpetologists
Swedish zoologists
Uppsala University alumni
People from Södermanland County